Charles Morgan (29 January 1839 – 17 July 1904) was an English cricketer. He played five first-class matches for Surrey between 1865 and 1871.

See also
 List of Surrey County Cricket Club players

References

External links
 

1839 births
1904 deaths
English cricketers
Surrey cricketers
People from Greenwich
Cricketers from Greater London
Gentlemen of England cricketers